The Dr. John D. Cooper Archaeological and Paleontological Center, or Cooper Center, was established by OC Parks and California State University, Fullerton in order to conserve, archive and manage the Orange County Archaeology and Paleontology Collections, including six million fossils.

The Cooper Center was named to commemorate Dr. John D. Cooper, professor emeritus of geological science at Cal State Fullerton, who campaigned for the conservation of the Orange County Collection, and died in 2007.

References

External links 
 Official J.D. Cooper Center website

California State University, Fullerton
Research institutes in California
Natural history of Orange County, California
Archaeological sites in California
Paleontology in California
Archaeological organizations
Archaeological research institutes
Paleontological institutions and organizations
Paleontological research institutes
Education in Orange County, California
Non-profit organizations based in California
Organizations based in Orange County, California
Research institutes established in 2011
2011 establishments in California